The Kondor B.I was a German two seat, biplane training aircraft designed and built close to the end of World War I.

Design and development
The Kondor B.I was built as a trainer aircraft of all-wood construction at the end of 1917. It was revolutionary in terms of reducing the number of parts necessary for the assembly of the aircraft to a minimum.
 
The first flight of the aircraft took place in January 1918. After successful test flights, a small batch of B.Is was ordered.

Specifications

References

Further reading

Biplanes
Single-engined tractor aircraft
1910s German fighter aircraft
Aircraft first flown in 1918